The Burn is a historic mansion in Waterproof, Louisiana, U.S.. It was built in 1856, and it was designed in the Greek Revival architectural style. It has been listed on the National Register of Historic Places since August 11, 1982.

References

Houses on the National Register of Historic Places in Louisiana
Greek Revival architecture in Louisiana
Houses completed in 1856
Buildings and structures in Tensas Parish, Louisiana